The supergalactic plane is part of a reference frame for the supercluster of galaxies that contains the Milky Way galaxy.

The supergalactic plane as so-far observed is more or less perpendicular to the plane of the Milky Way, the angle is 84.5 degrees. Viewed from the Earth, the plane traces a great circle across the sky through the constellations

 Cassiopeia (in the Milky Way galactic plane)
 Camelopardalis
 Ursa Major
 Coma Berenices (near the Milky Way galactic north pole)
 Virgo
 Centaurus
 Circinus (in the galactic plane)
 Triangulum Australe
 Pavo
 Indus
 Grus
 Sculptor (near the galactic south pole)
 Cetus
 Pisces
 Andromeda
 Perseus

History
In the 1950s the astronomer Gérard de Vaucouleurs recognized the existence of a flattened “local supercluster” from the Shapley-Ames Catalog in the environment of the Milky Way. He noticed that when one plots nearby galaxies in 3D, they lie more or less on a plane. A flattened distribution of nebulae had earlier been noted by William Herschel. Vera Rubin had also identified the supergalactic plane in the 1950s, but her data remained unpublished. The plane delineated by various galaxies defined in 1976 the equator of the supergalactic coordinate system he developed. In years thereafter with more observation data available de Vaucouleurs findings about the existence of the plane proved right.

Based on the supergalactic coordinate system of de Vaucouleurs, surveys in recent years determined the positions of nearby galaxy clusters relative to the supergalactic plane. Amongst others the Virgo cluster, the Norma cluster (including the Great Attractor), the Coma cluster, the Pisces-Perseus supercluster, the Hydra cluster, the Centaurus cluster, the Pisces-Cetus supercluster and the Shapley Concentration were found to be near the supergalactic plane.

Definition 
The supergalactic coordinate system is a spherical coordinate system in which the equator is the supergalactic plane.

 The zero point  is where the super-galactic plane intersects with the galactic plane - (SGB = 0°, SGL = 0°) - this lies at (lx = 137.37°, bx = 0°). In J2000 equatorial coordinates, this is approximately 2.82h, +59.5°.
 The plane passes through Earth, because the super-galactic plane is identified as a plane observed from Earth.
 The north supergalactic pole (SGB = 90°) lies at galactic coordinates in the constellation of Hercules ( = 47.37°,  = +6.32°). In the equatorial coordinate system (epoch J2000), this is approximately RA = 18.9h, Dec = +15.7°.

So the transformation from a triple of Cartesian supergalactic coordinates to a triple of galactic coordinates is

The left column in this matrix is the image of the origin of the supergalactic system in the galactic system, the right column in this matrix is the image of the north pole of the supergalactic coordinates in the galactic system, and the middle column is the cross product (to complete the right handed coordinate system).

See also
 Coordinate system
 Celestial coordinate system

References

External links 
 
 
 
 
 

Astronomical coordinate systems
Extragalactic astronomy